Couepia grandiflora, or sweet angelim, is a Brazilian fruit tree found in the Cerrado.

References

External links
 
 

Chrysobalanaceae
Flora of Brazil
Flora of the Cerrado
Trees of Brazil